Astragalus macrosemius is a species of milkvetch in the family Fabaceae. It is endemic to Iran.

References

macrosemius
Taxa named by Pierre Edmond Boissier
Taxa named by Rudolph Friedrich Hohenacker
Flora of Iran